Madagascesa is a genus of parasitoid wasps belonging to the family Ichneumonidae.

Species:
 Madagascesa nigrifacies

References

Ichneumonidae
Hymenoptera genera